Paret is a surname of Catalan origin, and may refer to:

 Aurélien Paret-Peintre (born 1996), French cyclist
 Benny Paret (1937–1962), Cuban welterweight boxer
 Eduardo Paret (born 1972), Cuban baseball player
 Henri Paret (cyclist, born 1854), French cyclist who rode in the 1904 Tour de France
 Henri Paret (cyclist, born 1929), French cyclist who rode in the 1952 and 1953 Tour de France
 Jahial Parmly Paret (1870–1952), known professionally as J. Parmly Paret, American tennis player and author
 Luis Paret y Alcázar (1746–1799), Spanish painter of the late-Baroque or Rococo period
 Peter Paret (1924–2020), American military, cultural and art historian with a particular interest in German history

See also 
 Pareto (disambiguation)
 Peret

Catalan words and phrases
Catalan-language surnames